Lycée Français International de Dubaï or Lycée Français International de l’AFLEC is a French international school in Dubai. It serves levels maternelle until lycée. It is one of five schools operated by the Association Franco-Libanaise pour l’Éducation et la Culture (AFLEC).

It opened in 2002.  43% of the students are French, 15% are Lebanese, and 42% are of other nationalities.

References

External links

 Lycée Français International de Dubaï 

Dubai
International schools in Dubai
International schools in the United Arab Emirates
Private schools in the United Arab Emirates
2002 establishments in the United Arab Emirates
Educational institutions established in 2002